Robinsons Corner is an unincorporated community in Butte County, California. It lies at an elevation of 105 feet (32 m).

References

Unincorporated communities in California
Unincorporated communities in Butte County, California